Stoke City may refer to:
 Stoke City F.C., an English men's association football team
 Stoke City F.C. (Women), an English women's association football team
 Stoke-on-Trent, a city in England

See also
 Stoke (disambiguation)
 Stroke City, a nickname for Derry/Londonderry, Northern Ireland